"That's the Way Love Is" is a song by Chicago-based dance trio Ten City, released in 1989 as a single from their debut album, Foundation (1989). The song reached number eight in the UK and number eighteen in West Germany, and was also the group's highest charting single on both the Billboard R&B and dance charts in the US. It peaked at number twelve on the Hot R&B Singles chart, and number one on the Hot Dance Club Play chart. Rolling Stone ranked "That's the Way Love Is" number 165 in their list of "200 Greatest Dance Songs of All Time" in 2022.

Release
The single release featured two main versions - on most releases, an acid house mix by Steve "Silk" Hurley (variously titled either "Deep House Mix" or "Acieeed Mix") was the A-side, while a string-led mix by Timmy Regisford, named the "Underground Mix", appeared on the B-side. Both mixes also had corresponding radio edits and dub versions.

Critical reception
Tim Jeffery from Record Mirror wrote, "The time has come. Ten City's 'That's The Way Love Is' is not just the latest club record to hit the charts, but a significant event that, along with their forthcoming album, Foundation, could turn out to be one of the major turning-points of dance music when the history books are written in years to come." Another editor, Betty Page commented, "Deeeeeep house, we now discover, is really just soul music in disguise — but with that insistently brilliant house beat, of course. Ten City encapsulate this form of dance-with-feeling, and seem destined on this showing to be a Big Act rather than just a faceless name on a dance record. I particularly liked the gospel-meets-acid bits."

Chart performance
"That's the Way Love Is" was a notable hit in Europe, New Zealand and the US, and is also the trio's most successful song on the charts. It entered the top 10 in the UK, peaking at number eight in its third week at the UK Singles Chart on January 29, 1989. Having debuted as number 33, it spent two weeks as number eight, before dropping to number 13 and 19 the following weeks. It entered the top 20 in West Germany (18) and Ireland (11), while peaking within the top 30 in Belgium (21) and the Netherlands (23). Outside Europe, "That's the Way Love Is" entered the top 30 also in New Zealand, peaking at number 24. In the US, the song charted on two different Billboard charts, peaking at number one on the Hot Dance Club Play chart and number 12 on the Hot R&B/Hip-Hop Songs chart.

Impact and legacy
Alex Henderson from AllMusic said it "aren't simply about the beat and the track, but also the rich vocals that would have sounded great even if Ten City had gone a cappella." He noted that "these guys enthusiastically recall the great soul/disco of the mid- to late 1970s and make no secret of their love of that era." 

In 1995, British DJ Graham Gold picked it as one of his favourite songs, saying, "I used to play this at Gullivers. The first time you ever hear Byron's voice you're sold – hook, line and sinker."

In 1999, the Chicago alt rock-soul group Poi Dog Pondering covered the song on their album Natural Thing. The group proceeded to remix the song several more times on their That's the Way Love Is (Re-Mix EP), which featured remixes by Maurice Josusah, Mike Dunn, Lego, Jesse De La Pena and Bunky.

In 2018, British magazine Mixmag included the song in their ranking of "Vocal House: The 30 All-Time Biggest Anthems". Tillie Wood wrote, 

In 2022, American magazine Rolling Stone ranked "That’s the Way Love Is" number 165 in their list of "200 Greatest Dance Songs of All Time".

Track listing
 7" single, US (1989)
"That's the Way Love Is" (Acieed Mix/Edited Version) – 4:10
"That's the Way Love Is" (Underground Mix/Edited Version) – 4:12

 12", US (1989)
"That's the Way Love Is" (Deep House Mix/Extended Version) – 6:44
"That's the Way Love Is" (Underground Mix/Extended Version) – 8:08

 12", Europe (1989)
"That's the Way Love Is" (Acieed Mix/Extended Version) – 6:44
"That's the Way Love Is" (Underground Mix/Extended Version) – 8:08
"Devotion" (Radio Mix) – 4:00

Charts

Weekly charts

Year-end charts

Byron Stingily version

Ten years later, former Ten City lead singer Byron Stingily returned to the top of the dance chart with his own recording of the song.

References

1989 singles
1999 singles
1989 songs
Electronic songs
House music songs

Acid house songs